Oya Dancia is a song by Nigerian recording artist, Olu Maintain. It was officially released in February 2014 from his debut album, Chosen One.
The song was recorded in Nigeria and produced by Tayo Adeyemi, a Nigerian music producer that produced Yahooze "Hypnotize me" and Yahooze.

Track listing
 Digital single

Release history

References

Olu Maintain songs
2014 singles
2014 songs